Kamil is a name used in a number of languages.

Kamil is a Polish, Czech, and Slovak given name, equivalent to the Italian Camillo, Spanish/Portuguese Camilo and French Camille. It is derived from Camillus, a Roman family name, which is sometimes claimed to mean "attendant at a religious service" in Latin, but may actually be of unknown Etruscan origin. The female version is Kamila, equivalent to English Camilla or Camila.

Kamil is also a Turkish name, with the female version Kamile. These names were common during Ottoman Empire and are not as common in Turkey today.

Kamil ( and ) is also an Arabic name, sometimes used as an adjective, more usually transliterated as Kamel and Kameel  which can be translated as "perfect" or "the Perfect One". It is also used in Urdu, Persian and Sindhi meaning "complete". In Islamic theology, al-Insān al-Kāmil, is a term used as an honorific title to describe Muhammad. It is an Arabic phrase meaning "the person who has reached perfection".

Given name

 Al-Kamil, Kurdish Ayyubid sultan, nephew of Saladin
 Kamil Bednář, Czech poet
 Kamil Bednarek, Polish musician
 Kamil Bortniczuk (born 1983), Polish Minister of Sport and Tourism
 Kamil Čontofalský, Slovak footballer
 Kamil Ahmet Çörekçi, Turkish footballer
 Kamil Damašek, Czech decathlete
 Kamil Durczok, Polish journalist
 Kamil Glik, Polish footballer
 Kamil Grosicki, Polish footballer
 Kamil Hornoch, Czech astronomer
 Kamil Kopúnek, Slovak footballer
 Kamil Kosowski, Polish footballer
 Kamil Krofta, Czech politician and historian
 Kamil Özerk, Norwegian-Turkish Cypriot educator and professor
 Kâmil Pasha (1833–1913), Turkish Cypriot statesman and grand vizier of the Ottoman Empire
Kamil Rustam, French musician
Kamil Stoch, Polish ski jumper
Kamil Tvrdek, Czech ice hockey player
Kamil Wilczek, Polish footballer
Kamil Yusuf Al-Bahtimi, Egyptian quranic reciter
Kamil Zeman, Czech writer, journalist and translator of German prose
 Kamil Zvelebil, Czech linguist specializing in South Asia
 Wan Kamil Mohamed Shafian (1967–2002), Singaporean murderer

Middle name
 Krzysztof Kamil Baczyński, Polish poet
 Cyprian Kamil Norwid, Polish poet

Surname

Kamil
 Mike Kamil, American bridge player 
 Mustafa Kamil Pasha, Egyptian lawyer and nationalist leader
 Omer Kamil, Sri Lankan politician
 Ridwan Kamil, Indonesian politician
 Kamil Patel , Indian Citizen

Kameel
 Fathi Kameel (born 1955), Kuwaiti football player

Fictional characters
Kamil, the main protagonist of the 13th century Arabic novel, The Treatise of Kamil, also known as Theologus Autodidactus.
Kamil Dowanna is a human knight from Produce and Enix's The 7th Saga for the SNES.
Kamille Bidan, also known as Kamil Bidan, the protagonist of the anime series Mobile Suit Zeta Gundam and a character in Mobile Suit Gundam ZZ.

Places
Kameel-rivier B, a village in the low-veld region of KwaNdebele, in the Nkangala District Municipality of the Mpumalanga province of South Africa
Kamil Crater, the meteorite impact crater in Egypt
Kamil, Osmancık

Books
The Complete History, known in Arabic as the Tareekh Kamil, written by Ali ibn al-Athir in 1231

References 

Masculine given names
Arabic masculine given names
Czech masculine given names
Polish masculine given names
Slovak masculine given names